Niinistö is a Finnish surname. Notable people with the surname include:

 Jussi Niinistö, Finnish politician and historian
 Sauli Niinistö, President of Finland from March 1, 2012
 Ville Niinistö, Finnish politician

Finnish-language surnames